This article is a listing of all of Gisselle’s albums and singles.

Albums

Compilations

Singles

References
The information gathered to make Gisselle’s discography page was found in the following sites.

http://www.allmusic.com 
http://www.billboard.com 
http://www.fye.com 
https://www.riaa.com 

Discographies of American artists
Tropical music discographies